Guild Software is a small independent computer game developer located in Milwaukee, Wisconsin (USA) founded in 1998. Guild Software is best known for creating Vendetta Online, a first-person MMORPG that uses their in-house NAOS game engine. In 2009, the studio was voted a Reader's Choice Award for Favorite Company by MMOsite.com.

In 2013, Guild Software's Vendetta Online was widely reported as the first MMORPG to support the Oculus Rift, making it potentially the first persistent online world with native support for a consumer Virtual reality headset.

Beyond game development, the company also created and maintains the free and popular Android app Barometer HD, allowing simple measurement and graphing of barometric pressure on devices equipped with pressure sensors.

Management

John Bergman — CEO, game design, artwork
Ray Ratelis — VP of engineering

References

External links
Guild Software Website
NAOS Engine

Video game companies of the United States
Video game companies established in 1998
Video game development companies
Companies based in Milwaukee
Mobile game companies